Iva Majoli won in the final 7–5, 1–6, 7–6 against Jana Novotná.

Seeds
A champion seed is indicated in bold text while text in italics indicates the round in which that seed was eliminated. The top four seeds received a bye to the second round.

  Iva Majoli (champion)
  Anke Huber (semifinals)
 n/a
  Jana Novotná (final)
  Helena Suková (second round)
  Sabine Appelmans (second round)
  Kristie Boogert (first round)
 n/a

Draw

Final

Section 1

Section 2

External links
 1996 Faber Grand Prix Draw

Faber Grand Prix
1996 WTA Tour